The Walker Collection is a collection of philatelic material relating to the Second World War German occupation issues of the Channel Islands that forms part of the British Library Philatelic Collections. The collection is mainly of Guernsey material. It was formed by G.L. Walker and donated to the British Museum in 1948.

See also
Postage stamps and postal history of Jersey
Postage stamps and postal history of Guernsey

References

British Library Philatelic Collections
Philately of the United Kingdom
History of the Channel Islands